Balesin-e Sharifabad (also Romanized as Bālesīn-e Sharīfābād) is a village in Barvanan-e Gharbi Rural District, Torkamanchay District, Meyaneh County, East Azerbaijan Province, Iran. At the 2006 census, its population was 207, in 57 families.

References 

Populated places in Meyaneh County